"You Need a Mess of Help to Stand Alone" is a song by American rock band the Beach Boys from their 1972 album Carl and the Passions – "So Tough". It was written by Brian Wilson and Jack Rieley, and was issued as the album's lead single with the B-side "Cuddle Up". The single failed to chart.

Background
An earlier, unreleased version of the song was titled "Beatrice from Baltimore".

Asked about the song in 1972, Mike Love commented, "I like the track, it's one that requires a few plays to get into it. A point about a lot of Brian's things is that they are so oblique and often complex. His music is something that you have to listen to, because he'll put in subtleties that you can listen to for a year and not hear."

Alternate releases
A track and backing vocals mix of "You Need a Mess of Help to Stand Alone" was included on the 2021 box set Feel Flows as a teaser for the band's next archival release, Sail On Sailor – 1972 (2022).

Legacy
 In 1993, Saint Etienne adopted the song title for their album You Need a Mess of Help to Stand Alone.

 In 1999, Hefner released a cover of "You Need a Mess of Help to Stand Alone" as a bonus track to their single "The Hymn for the Cigarettes".

Personnel
Credits from Craig Slowinski, John Brode, Will Crerar and Joshilyn Hoisington.

The Beach Boys
Ricky Fataar - drums, tambourine
Al Jardine - backing vocals
Mike Love - backing vocals
Brian Wilson - backing vocals, tack piano, Hammond organ, producer
Carl Wilson - lead and backing vocals, electric lead and rhythm guitars, producer

Additional musicians
Tandyn Almer - bass guitar
Douglas Dillard - banjo
Billy Hinsche - electric rhythm guitar
Gordon Marron - electric violin w/ ring modulator

References

Bibliography

External links
 

1972 singles
The Beach Boys songs
Songs written by Brian Wilson
Songs written by Jack Rieley
Song recordings produced by Carl Wilson
1972 songs
Reprise Records singles